Hector Luis Marinaro Jr (born December 6, 1964) is a Canadian soccer coach and former player who is the men's soccer coach at John Carroll University.

As a player he was the all-time leader in points and goals in professional indoor soccer, and made 6 appearances for the Canadian national team.

Club career

Youth
Marinaro is the son of Hector Marinaro, Sr., a native of Argentina who both played and coached extensively in Canada.

Indoor career

Marinaro returned to Cleveland because of the excellent memories he had of playing his rookie year there.

On June 23, 2004, the Chicago Storm drafted Marinaro with the 16th pick in the MISL expansion draft. However, he made his intentions to retire known to the Storm and on October 11, 2004, the team traded Marinaro to the Cleveland Force in exchange for cash. The Storm did this in order to allow him to retire with the Force, the team with which he began his career.During his 19-year indoor career, Marinaro scored 1,233 goals and added 702 assists for 1,935 points in just 685 games. In the playoffs, he scored another 224 goals and added 96 assists for 320 points in 104 games. Marinaro is the all-time leading in goals (1,457) and points (2,255) in professional indoor soccer. He scored his 1,000th point against his brother Rob, a goalkeeper for the Chicago Power. Hector was a seven-time league MVP the most in any professional sport in the USA. In May 2005, the MISL announced that it would name its annual MVP award the Marinaro Award.

Outdoor career
In addition to his extensive indoor career, Marinaro spent several seasons playing outdoor soccer. In 1986, he played for the Toronto Blizzard of the National Soccer League while his father was an assistant coach with the team. Marinaro remained with the Blizzard for the 1987 Canadian Soccer League season then returned to the Blizzard for the 1993 American Professional Soccer League season.  He also had one season with Rochester Raging Rhinos of the A-League in 1996.  Marinaro scored seven goals, as the Rhinos fell to the Seattle Sounders in the championship game.

International career
Marinaro also earned six caps with Canada. Marinaro's first game with the national team was a 4–0 win over Indonesia on August 30, 1986, and his last was a 2–1 loss to Chile on October 11, 1995.

Coaching career
In 2002, the Cleveland Force elevated Marinaro to the position of assistant coach in addition to his playing duties. He continued in that role until retiring in 2004. On January 31, 2006, John Carroll University hired Marinaro as the head coach of the men's soccer team.

References

External links
  (archive)
 
 MISL stats
 Interview with Hector Marinaro conducted by Dan Coughlin at Cleveland Public Library on September 27, 2016.
 Indoor Stats
 Outdoor Stats

1964 births
Living people
Soccer players from Toronto
Canadian people of Argentine descent
Association football forwards
Canadian soccer players
Canada men's international soccer players
Canadian expatriate soccer players
Canadian expatriate sportspeople in the United States
Toronto Italia players
Cleveland Force (original MISL) players
Minnesota Strikers (MISL) players
Toronto Blizzard (1986–1993) players
Los Angeles Lazers players
Rochester New York FC players
Cleveland Crunch (original MISL) players
Cleveland Crunch (NPSL) players
Cleveland Crunch (MSL) players
Cleveland Crunch (2001–2002 MISL) players
Cleveland Force (2002–2005 MISL) players
Cleveland Freeze
Canadian Soccer League (1987–1992) players
Major Indoor Soccer League (1978–1992) players
American Professional Soccer League players
National Professional Soccer League (1984–2001) players
Major Indoor Soccer League (2001–2008) players
Expatriate soccer players in the United States
John Carroll University
Canadian National Soccer League players
People from Brunswick, Ohio
National Professional Soccer League (1984–2001) commentators
Hamilton Steelers (1981–1992) players
North York Rockets players